The 27th European Women's Artistic Gymnastics Championships were held from 3 April to 6 April 2008 in Clermont-Ferrand.

France earned their first team medal, the bronze.

Oldest and youngest competitors

Country represented

Medal Count

Combined

Seniors

Juniors

Medal Winners

Results

Team Competition 

Oldest and youngest competitors

Vault 
Carlotta Giovannini was the defending champion.

Oldest and youngest competitors

Final Results

Uneven bars 
Dariya Zgoba was the defending champion.

Oldest and youngest competitors

Final Results

Balance beam 
Yulia Lozhechko was the defending champion.

Oldest and youngest competitors

Final Results

Floor 
Vanessa Ferrari was the defending champion.

Oldest and youngest competitors

Final Results

Juniors

Team Competition

The junior team competition also served as qualification for the individual event finals. The 8 highest-ranked teams are shown here; the other teams were Switzerland, Germany, Belarus, Greece, Hungary, Slovenia, Austria, Bulgaria, Finland, Turkey, Czech Republic, Portugal, Poland, Iceland, Sweden, Lithuania, Latvia, Denmark and Norway.

Vault 
Final Results

Uneven bars 
Final Results

Balance beam 
Final Results

Floor 
Final Results

References

External links
 

2008
European Women's Artistic Gymnastics Championships
Sport in Clermont-Ferrand
International gymnastics competitions hosted by France
2008 in European sport
2008 in French sport